Cirrula is a genus of North American shore flies in the family Ephydridae.

Species
C. austrina (Coquillett, 1900)
C. gigantea Cresson, 1915

References

Ephydridae
Brachycera genera
Diptera of North America
Taxa named by Ezra Townsend Cresson